Sitobion is a genus of aphids in the family Aphididae. There are more than 80 described species in Sitobion.

Species
These 81 species belong to the genus Sitobion:

 Sitobion africanum (Hille Ris Lambers, 1954)
 Sitobion alopecuri (Takahashi, 1921)
 Sitobion anselliae (Hall, 1932)
 Sitobion asirum Aldryhim & Ilharco, 1996
 Sitobion aulacorthoides (David, Narayanan & Rajasingh, 1971)
 Sitobion autriquei Remaudière, 1985
 Sitobion avenae (Fabricius, 1775) (English grain aphid)
 Sitobion bambusicola
 Sitobion bamendae (Eastop, 1959)
 Sitobion beiquei (Hille Ris Lambers, 1960)
 Sitobion berchemiae
 Sitobion berkemiae (Shinji, 1941)
 Sitobion brevirostre (Heikenheimo, 1978)
 Sitobion breymiae Noordam, 2004
 Sitobion burundiense Remaudière, 1985
 Sitobion calvulum
 Sitobion caricis (Glendenning, 1926)
 Sitobion cissi (Theobald, 1920)
 Sitobion colei (Eastop, 1959)
 Sitobion congolense (Doncaster & Hille Ris Lambers, 1956)
 Sitobion cuscutae (Holman, 1974)
 Sitobion dismilaceti (Zhang, 1980)
 Sitobion eulophiae Remaudière, 1985
 Sitobion fragariae (Walker, 1848)
 Sitobion graminearum (Mordvilko, 1919)
 Sitobion graminis Takahashi, 1950
 Sitobion gravelii (van der Goot, 1917)
 Sitobion halli (Eastop, 1959)
 Sitobion hillerislambersi van Harten, 1979
 Sitobion himalayensis
 Sitobion hirsutirostris (Eastop, 1959)
 Sitobion ibarae (Matsumura, 1917)
 Sitobion indicum Basu, 1964
 Sitobion isodonis Sorin, 1979
 Sitobion kamtshaticum (Mordvilko, 1919)
 Sitobion krahi (Eastop, 1959)
 Sitobion kurimahala van Harten, 1990
 Sitobion lambersi David, 1956
 Sitobion leelamaniae (David, 1958)
 Sitobion leonidasi Remaudière, 1985
 Sitobion loranthi
 Sitobion luteum (Buckton, 1876) (orchid aphid)
 Sitobion manitobense (Robinson, 1965)
 Sitobion martorelli (Smith, 1960)
 Sitobion matatum (Eastop, 1959)
 Sitobion mesosphaeri (Tissot, 1934)
 Sitobion microspinulosum (David, Rajasingh & Narayanan, 1972)
 Sitobion milii Remaudière, 1985
 Sitobion mimosae
 Sitobion miscanthi (Takahashi, 1921)
 Sitobion mucatha (Eastop, 1955)
 Sitobion neusi
 Sitobion nigeriense (Eastop, 1959)
 Sitobion nigrinectarium (Theobald, 1915)
 Sitobion niwanistum (Hottes, 1933)
 Sitobion ochnearum (Eastop, 1959)
 Sitobion orchidacearum
 Sitobion paludum F.P.Muller, 1982
 Sitobion papillatum Remaudière, 1985
 Sitobion pauliani Remaudière, 1957
 Sitobion phyllanthi (Takahashi, 1937)
 Sitobion plectranthi (Ghosh, Ghosh & Raychaudhuri, 1971)
 Sitobion pseudoalupecuri
 Sitobion pseudoluteum
 Sitobion qinghaiense (Zhang, Chen, Zhong & Li, 1999)
 Sitobion raoi
 Sitobion rosaeiformis (Das, 1918)
 Sitobion rosivorum (Zhang, 1980)
 Sitobion scabripes Ghosh, 1972
 Sitobion schoelli
 Sitobion scoticum (Stroyan, 1969)
 Sitobion sikkimense (Ghosh & Raychaudhuri, 1968)
 Sitobion smilacicola (Takahashi, 1924)
 Sitobion smilacifoliae (Takahashi, 1921)
 Sitobion takahashii (Eastop, 1959)
 Sitobion thalictri Remaudière, 1985
 Sitobion triumfettae Remaudière, 1985
 Sitobion wikstroemiae
 Sitobion yakini (Eastop, 1959)
 Sitobion yasumatsui
 Sitobion yongyooti (Robinson, 1972)

References

Further reading

 
 

Sternorrhyncha genera
Articles created by Qbugbot
Macrosiphini